Joseph Keenan may refer to:

 Joseph B. Keenan (1888–1954), politician
 Joseph D. Keenan (1896–1984), American labor union leader
 Joseph Henry Keenan (1900–1977), thermodynamicist
 Joe Keenan (footballer) (born 1982), English footballer
 Joe Keenan (writer) (born 1958), American screenwriter, producer and writer